Fascista bimaculella is a moth of the family Gelechiidae. It is found in North America, where it has been recorded from Florida, Kentucky, Maine, Ohio and Texas.

The forewings are shining dark purplish-brown or black with a large white spot on the disc just beyond the middle, and a white spot or streak which starts from the beginning of the costal cilia, but does not reach the dorsal margin.

References

Moths described in 1872
Gelechiini